Michaela Paetsch Neftel (born Michaela Modjeska Paetsch; November 12, 1961 – January 20, 2023) was an American violinist who was born in Colorado Springs. She was known for being the first American female to have recorded all 24 Paganini Caprices for solo violin. She was first prize winner in the 1984 G. B. Dealey Awards and a top prize winner in the 1985 Queen Elisabeth Competition and a special prize winner at the International Tchaikovsky Competition held in 1986.

Early life
Michaela Modjeska Paetsch was born on November 12, 1961, the second oldest of seven children in Colorado Springs, Colorado and was named after the famous Polish actress Helena Modjeska.

Her parents were Günther Johannes Paetsch who was from Germany and Priscilla Paetsch who was American, and she was raised with two sisters (Phebe and Brigitte) and four brothers (Johann, Christian, Englebert and Siegmund). Paetsch's father was a cellist and her mother was violinist. Both parents played in the Colorado Springs Symphony Orchestra and they also taught all of the 7 children to play stringed instruments. Paetsch's family was passionate about classical music.

Michaela Paetsch had her first lesson at the age of three from her mother and immediately after showed her two-year-old sister Brigitte exactly what she had been taught with the violin.

When Michaela was just a little more than a baby, her father Gunther Paetsch had taken apart an old violin to take out some of the dirt and to repair some cracks. When it was still apart, she, as a tiny little girl went around carrying the belly of that violin which was eggshell thin and said “This will be MY violin someday.” And even when the glue was not even dry on it, she grabbed it and said, “Mama, I want this violin and I’m going to play it now,” even though the violin was way too small. She did in fact earn all the money and paid for the violin all by herself.

Career

1960s
The children and both their parents, who are professional musicians, formed the Paetsch Family Chamber Music Ensemble which gave many concerts throughout state of Colorado. Michaela Paetsch gave her first public recital at the age of seven. She performed with the Baroque Players in Colorado Springs, as well as the Jefferson Symphony in Golden, Colorado. On November 1, 1969 Priscilla Paetsch presented her daughter and student Michaela Modjeska Paetsch, who was seven years old, in a 3 p.m. Saturday afternoon Recital program. Michaela played 4 Sonatas by Corelli; Sonata in A Major, No. 9, Sonata in F Major, Sonata in E Major and Sonata in D Minor. Also playing on this recital was her older sister Phebe Verena Paetsch, age 9 and her younger sister Brigitte McClure Paetsch, age 6.

1970s

Michaela went to Skyway elementary school and performed there her first public performance at the age of seven together with her sisters Phebe and Brigitte and brother Johann, who had just began Kindergarten.

Music was very much part of life in the Paetsch Family. Being taught by their parents how to play the stringed instruments violin, viola, and cello, the children grew up involved in music, hearing symphonies and operas in rehearsal and in concert, hearing quartets and chamber music groups and so it became quite natural that each of the children wanted to play one or more instruments.

In 1970, by the time Michaela was nine she was the first-chair violinist for the Fort Carson Little Theatre production of the “Fiddler on the Roof.” The Paetsch Chamber Music Ensemble was formed in 1971. Her playing began to receive attention and she attended the Cheyenne Mountain Junior High School only half a day to devote more of herself to music.

In 1972, at the age of ten, Michaela Paetsch she was concertmaster of the Cosmic Heights Chamber Orchestra and played as 1st violinist with the Baroque Players as well playing as a soloist with them. In a concert at the Penrose Library Auditorium in Colorado Springs the program included: Vivaldi's Concerto gross in D minor, Op. 3 No. 11, Mozart's Divertimento in D, K. 136, Albinoni's Sonata a Cinque in G Minor and Corelli's Concerto Grosso Op. 6, No. 4. Although they had given concert performances for television and in Pueblo this was their first public performance together in Colorado Springs followed soon after by performances in Canon City and Palmer Lake.

In 1972, for the Centennial Celebration of Colorado Springs’ 100 years as an incorporated city, the Paetsch family of Colorado Springs gave a concert in conjunction with Heritage Day on the lawn of the El Paso County Court House.

On Sunday, March 18, 1973 the Paetsch Family Orchestra began a series of concerts throughout the state of Colorado starting at the Sangre de Cristo Arts and Conference Center in Pueblo. Michaela Modjeska Paetsch, who was 11, was featured playing the Mendelssohn Violin Concerto in D Minor, the Vitali “Chaconne”, Vivaldi “Season’ and the first violin solo part of the “Sixth Brandenburg Concerto” by Johann Sebastian Bach. Gunther Paetsch was quoted in saying: “Although the children are still very young, they are very dedicated to their art. They arise at 6 a.m. daily to practice their violins and violas for two hours before breakfast.” After the family concert in Pueblo, the Ensemble performed at the Temple Buell College in Denver on March 29th and during the month of April performed concerts in the cities of Boulder, Greeley, Ft. Collins, and Steamboat Springs. Colorado Springs violinist Michaela Paetsch, 11, received a standing ovation after playing at the Colorado Women's College. She performed the Mendelssohn Violin Concerto in D Minor as well as 3 other selections.

The Paetsch Family gave a concert in the new Community Center at the Abbey School in Canon City in 1973. On the program was the Antonio Vivaldi Concerto for Violin in A Major Op. 7 No. 12, followed by the Nicolo Paganini Sonata in A Major for Violin and Strings and the Johann Christian Bach Quintet in D Major Op. 11 No. 6. After the intermission was the Georg Friedrich Handel's Concerto Grosso Op. 6 No. 7 and the Pablo de Sarasate's Spanish Dances for violin and Strings. The Concert ended with Giuseppe Tartini's virtuoso Variations for Violin and Strings over a Theme by Corelli. By this time Michaela Paetsch, age 11, had a repertoire of more than 30 violin concertos by Bach, Vivaldi, Mozart, Haydn, Tartini and Paganini all of these pieces were taught by her mother Priscilla Paetsch who had dedicated herself to the training of young musicians, many of whom have become famous soloists and hold important positions in orchestras throughout the United States. Her parents, Mr. and Mrs. Gunther Paetsch were well known as performers and teachers of violin, viola and cello in the Rocky Mountain region. Both had been first violinist and principal cellist of the Colorado Springs Symphony, the Opera, the Chamber Soloists, The Baroque Players and the Colorado Springs String Quartet for many years as well as playing in  many solo concerts in the Colorado region.

On May 12, 1974 The Paetsch Chamber Music Ensemble gave a special mothers day concert at the “Colorado Springs Y/USO Community Center” in Colorado Springs. On the program was “The Spring” by Antonio Vivaldi, the Double Concerto in D minor for two violins by Bach, and Boccherini’s Cello Quintet Op. 37, No. 7. A week later she was the featured soloist with the Jefferson Symphony in Golden, Colorado. There she played three contrasting concertos for violin by the composers Bach, Vivaldi and Mendelssohn.

October 17, 1974, Michaela Paetsch appeared playing the Mendelssohn Violin Concerto Op.64 with the Pueblo Symphony conducted by Gerhard Track. She received a standing ovation and played as an encore the Bach A Minor Fugue for solo violin.

On February 9th, 1975 the City of Colorado Springs presented a “Family Concert” with conductor Charles A. Ansbacher and the Colorado Springs Symphony Orchestra in Palmer Auditorium. The featured soloist was 13-year-old Michaela Paetsch performing the Mendelssohn Violin concerto in E Minor. Michaela was a student at the Cheyenne Mountain Junior High School at the time.

Gunther Paetsch, a cello teacher at Colorado College, was quoted saying: “I believe that in this time, when most children spend a lot of time passively in front of television, it is especially important that children can enjoy and be actively engaged in some artistic and creative field. This will benefit all other fields.” The Paetsch String Sextet consisted in 1972 of Michaela Modjeska Paetsch as concertmaster and solo violist, Priscilla Paetsch as violinist and violist, Gunther Paetsch as principal cellist and the tutti voices and solo inner violin and viola parts were played by Brigitte and Phebe Paetsch. Johann Sebastian Paetsch was Continuo cellist. One of the programs included Vivaldi's double violin concerto, Corelli's double violin concerto, Mozart's divertimento and Johann Sebastian Bach's 6th Brandenburg Concerto which was at that time rarely heard and seldom performed because of its unusual orchestration in the score. It was written only for violas and cellos and was dedicated to the Margrave Christian Ludwig of Brandenburg, in Germany. The two solo viola parts were a trial of virtuosity and were played by Michaela and her mother Priscilla.

When she was 12 years old she won both the Colorado Springs Young Artists contest and the Pueblo Young Artists contest and as a result appeared at that age as soloist with the Colorado Springs Symphony, the Pueblo Symphony under the direction of Gerhard Track and the Jefferson Symphony in Denver, Colorado.

As the featured soloist, Michaela, at the age of 13, performed with the Colorado Springs Symphony in a series of school concerts. In the summer of 1975 Michaela was given a scholarship by the Colorado Springs Symphony Guild and Mr. and by Mrs. George Vradenburg of Colorado Springs to go and study in the Meadowmount School of Music, which is in Upstate New York with the famous violinists Ivan Galamian and Joseph Gingold.

Michaela, in May 1976, at the age of 14, gave three performances of Eduard Lalo's “Symphonie Espagnol” with the Colorado Springs Symphony as the featured soloist under the direction of Charles Ansbacher. She was also, at this time, the youngest full time member (sitting next to her mother Priscilla, in the 1st violin section) of the Colorado Springs Symphony in its history.

Michaela Modjeska Paetsch at the age of 14 was the soloist and first violinist of “The Paetsch Family Chamber Music Ensemble” and performed as the featured soloist the Johann Sebastian Bach violin concerto in A minor, the Joseph Haydn violin concerto No.2 and the “Concerto a 5” by Antonio Vivaldi. On the second half of the program she performed with her family the Johannes Brahms Sextet Op.18 in B Major for 2 violins, 2 violas and 2 celli. During the summer of 1976, Michaela attended the Marlboro Music Festival from a personal invitation of James Buswell, after she met him when he was soloist with the Colorado Springs Symphony.

From the years 1971-1976 the Paetsch Family Ensemble, headed by Priscilla and Gunther Paetsch and included seven children ranging in ages from 5 to 16, performed classical music for thousands of Coloradans (which included thousands of school children) throughout the state and especially to residents of Colorado Springs. The family gave their services for fund-raising projects, to the Penrose Public Library, in the Fine Arts Center, for the Symphony Guild, as well and on television for numerous churches and civic organizations as well as for the celebration of Heritage Day at the old Court House in the City of Colorado Springs. They also gave the first live presentation of classical music in the history of Colorado Springs on the radio station KKFM.

The Paetsch Family, with Michaela as 1st violinist, performed to enthusiastic audiences at the University of Colorado in Boulder, at Colorado Women's College in Denver, at the Fine Arts Center in Pueblo, together with the Jefferson Symphony in Golden and at Adams State University in Alamosa where they received standing ovations. In Cañon City they gave the opening performances in the new Community Center, and in the city of Steamboat Springs they gave the opening classical concert in the new performing arts theater. The Paetsch family performed in the University Center at the University of Colorado in Colorado Springs in 1977. On the program were sextets, Tchaikovsky's “Souvenir de Florence” and Brahms Sextet Op. 36. Michaela had blossomed into the star of the ensemble, and the performances had earned standing ovations from audiences wherever she appeared in concert. Michaela, during this time, had also just won the first prize in the Jefferson Symphony Young Artist contest playing the Sibelius violin concerto.

The Rocky Mountain News wrote about the ensemble: “One had to be amazed, that everything was performed so well. The audience responded with a standing ovation before intermission. The group had won the hearts of the audience.” The Pueblo Chieftain wrote: “The Paetsch Family is truly gifted in terms of discipline, talent and the desire to give of themselves. It is amazing to see six members of a family who have learned to play together with total accuracy and sensitivity.” The members of the Paetsch Family Chamber Music Ensemble at that time were Michaela, 15, Phebe, 16, Brigitte, 13, Johann, 11, Christian, 9 and of course Priscilla and Gunther (the parents). The youngest Paetsch boys, Engelbert, 7, and Siegmund, 5, would be soon joining the family ensemble.

Critics praised the level a maturity in the Family performance, with one reviewer of the Colorado Springs Gazette Telegraph writing “When children who look like angels also perform like angels, who possess all the skill necessary to tackle the heroic, Herculean and at times unfathomable Brahms Sextet - when cascading technical passages are performed with effortless execution and are marked by a lush tone and a perfect intonation that make the Brahms masterpiece a glorious sound of syncopation, excitement, breadth and brilliance, then we have true greatness in our midst. The Paetsch family, including mother, father and their angelic-looking children display musical discipline and artistry of the highest form and are truly worthy of all the support our community can possibly give them.” The Paetsch family was often called “The Trapp Family of Colorado.”
In recognition of their services to the community the family was recently nominated for the “American Musical Family Award” given by the American Music Conference.

Michaela Paetsch, who was in Cheyenne Mountain Junior High School at the time, together with her family, played concerts three times a day and three times a week for schools, for nursing homes, and for hospitals. One year they played more than 300 concerts. Mark Arnest of The Gazette in Colorado Springs wrote: 

Michaela practiced a minimum of four hours a day, and increased that amount when she was preparing for competitions. Michaela Paetsch, at the age of 16, won first prize in the National String Competition sponsored by ASTA, American String Teachers Association which was held in Chicago, Illinois. She won the $1,000 first prize in the Spencer Penrose Scholarship Musical awards, given in association with the Central City Opera Festival. Michaela was also a try-state winner in the Kiwanis Stars of Tomorrow talent search. Michaela won in 1977 the senior high strings competition in the Colorado State Music Teachers Association Convention at the Brown Palace hotel in Denver, while her younger brother Johann won the junior high strings competition. She was selected to represent Colorado at the divisional auditions in Saint Paul, Minnesota.

Michaela's mother, Priscilla Paetsch, in 1977 once said speaking about her children: "They are the best musicians we have ever played with. We have passed on all of the good knowledge we have gained in our lifetimes to them."

Michaela's father, Gunther Paetsch remarked that" It is very unusual at that age to have so much expression when they play. Music is something you communicate to someone. To just play is something anyone can do - play one note after the next. Many people can even play the same notes but it's a very special talent to have the expression. To be so talented at such a young age and not only have the facility, but the musical expression - that is something."

Besides playing the violin Michaela and the other siblings went swimming, skiing, ice skating, hiking and rode their horses that they had right at the house. They had miles and miles of wilderness right at their doorstep.

Michaela said once in an interview: “I knew when I was 3 years old that I would be a violinist. One of the words I learned was patience, I learned that in a good way.” She spoke of the six-hour rehearsals with no breaks, and of performing six violin concertos in a single concert.

In March 1977, Michaela, was featured as the 15-year-old violinist of Colorado Springs performing the Beethoven “Romance No.2 for Violin and Orchestra” as well as the Wieniawski “Grand Polonaise in D for Violin and Orchestra” with the Denver Symphony.

That same March of 1977 the Paetsch family ensemble played in Bethany Baptist Church and Grace Episcopal Church two weeks apart. In both programs were performed two quite ambitious musical works: The String Sextet No. 2, Opus 36 by Johannes Brahms, and the  String Sextet in D minor "Souvenir de Florence", Opus 70 by Pyotr Ilyich Tchaikovsky. Critics praised the level of maturity in the Paetsch family performances, with one reviewer of  The Gazette-Telegraph, John Fetler writing, "In this school educators could find a lesson, as the Brahms-Tchaikovsky program showed. The children and parents play so well together (a remarkable pedagogical feat) that the listener is drawn from simply admiring such a musical family, into the music itself. Teaching children to play string instruments is difficult in itself, as many a music teacher knows in schools; but to have them adopt the musical language as their own, and express it in the serious terms of what the composer intended is quite a bit more." And Dr. Julius Baird remarked; "They have not only the proficiency, but also the feeling for the music which they play which is transmitted to the audience."

In the summer of 1977 some of the Paetsch children played in The Troupe's Broadway productions of "A Little Night Music" and "West Side Story" which performed nightly at the Fine Arts Center in Colorado Springs directed by Bob Boyd. These performances went on while the parents Gunther and Priscilla were playing in the Colorado Opera Festival playing Verdi's "Aida" directed by Donald Jenkins.

In 1978 Michaela Paetsch, only 16 years old at he time, was the concertmistress of the Colorado Philharmonic Orchestra (a national repertory orchestra) which performed in Evergreen, Colorado playing under the musical direction of Carl Topilow. She was 16 and concertmistress even though the age limit was to be older than 18. She was only sixteen years old when she was called an award-winning violinist from Colorado Springs that has been hailed as one of the most outstanding young performing artists in the world. There she performed the Bruch Violin Concerto in G Minor and thrilled the audience. 

In October 1978, the 16-year-old Michaela Paetsch after winning numerous regional and national competitions with her violin, appeared as a special feature at the premiere performance of the Grand Junction Symphony Orchestra playing the Bruch Violin Concerto in G Minor. She displayed an airy, delicate touch and a true, vibrant tone with the pieces many doubled-stopped note passages and unusual intervals.  Carl Topilow was conducting. In an interview Michaela said that she practiced a minimum of four hours a day, increasing that amount when she was preparing for a competition. Later that month she appeared in a solo concert in Salt Lake City, with the Brico Symphony in Denver as well as the Grand Junction concert.

In 1979 Michaela performed Dvorak's Violin Concerto with Myung-Whun Chung conducting the Debut Orchestra of Young Musicians Foundation in the Willshire Ebell Theater in Los Angeles, California.

She graduated from Cheyenne Mountain High School in Colorado Springs in June of 1979.

1980s
The true tale of the unforgettable night in March of 1980 when their Dodge Maxi Van broke down  on the journey home from their exhilarating family concert in Bozeman, Montana, still is talked about. Gunther, having accepted a majestic, young pure-bred Arabian colt as payment for their previous performance, was left destitute, devoid of any cash to carry on. In a bid to satiate their hunger, they valiantly played for their supper at a senior citizen's dinner in Chugwater, Wyoming. With nowhere to go, they sought refuge in a nearby church for the next few days until the part would arrive to fix the van. In the midst of this turmoil, Michaela and Priscilla took to the roads, bravely hitch-hiking their way on the highway in the middle of the night to catch an airplane out out of Denver to the east for another concert, their intrepid spirit driving them forward. The pure-bred Arabian colt that they had acquired was named "Nakiro," a name that would go on to hold great significance for Michaela, who trained and rode the young stallion in the rugged mountains behind their house, forging an unbreakable bond.

The Colorado Springs Fine Arts Center was where the Paetsch Family Chamber Music Ensemble captivated the audience with presentation of a virtuosic performance of three major chamber compositions on August 23 1981. The program started with the Concerto for Two Violins in A minor from "L'estro armonico" by Antonio Vivaldi, then the String Sextet No. 1 in B-flat Major by Johannes Brahms and then the Quintet in C Major by Franz Schubert. J. Julius Baird wrote a critic in the Colorado Springs Sun newspaper that said, "The closing Rondo possessed a transparency and remarkable precision only heard in the finest ensembles." He continued his review with "The treatment of this mood changing was accomplished so skillfully one would think a sculptor was molding the sound. The Scherzo was played with great technical skill showing controlled contrasts in dynamics as if all parts were played by a single person. The Allegretto brought to a close an afternoon of superb chamber music"

Michaela Paetsch went to study at Yale University with the famous Polish-born violinist Szymon Goldberg. It just happened that Szymon Goldberg had also been the teacher of Priscilla (Michaela’s mother) when Priscilla was younger. Yale had a mandatory retirement age so Goldberg had to retire and but he continued teaching at the Curtis Institute of Music. She followed him and studied with him also at Curtis Institute of Music in Philadelphia. In one her many recitals at the Curtis Institute she programed the solo works by Bach, Paganini and Bartok and premiered Daron Aric Hagen's “Occasional Notes” and William Coble's “Intrada.” Daron Hagen was quoted as saying: “I want Michaela to keep appearing before the public. She is in that netherworld between leaving school and winning the big competition.” Both Daron and Coble learned a great deal about the violin's possibilities from hearing Michaela Paetsch play and seeing her at work on the instrument. In July 1985 the Colorado-born violinist Michaela Paetsch tossed off Hindemith's Kammermusik No.4, a thorny little chamber concerto for violin solo and small orchestra, the work's numerous technical difficulties with breathtaking ease and conveyed an enthusiasm for the works's elusive musical content.

Michaela Modjeska Paetsch performed the Boccherini String Quintet in A Major and the Brahms Sextet in B-flat in the Marlboro Festival in Vermont in 1981.
Michaela was invited to play the Tchaikovsky Violin Concerto with the Portland Symphony on the 22nd of July 1983 with the director, Bruce Hangen.

On August 6, 1983, Michaela Paetsch played with her cellist brother Johann Sebastian Paetsch in Calgary, Canada. On the program was Johannes Brahms's Concerto for Violin and Cello in A minor, Op. 102. The conductor was Victor Feldbrill and the orchestra was the Calgary Philharmonic Orchestra.
Michaela Modjeska Paetsch of Colorado Springs won 1st prize in the G. B. Dealey International Competition Dallas in May 1984 when she was 22 years old. She won the cash prize of $7,500 and a solo appearance with the Dallas Symphony during the 1985–86 season.

Violinist Michaela Paetsch received a special prize for the best performance of a compulsory work by Russian composer Yuri Falik at the closing ceremony on July 4, 1986 in the prestigious International Tchaikovsky Competition held every four years in Moscow, Russia. Her brother Johann Paetsch took part in the cello competition at the same time in Moscow.

In 1987 Michaela Paetsch made a Digital Disk CD playing all of the 24 Paganini Caprices for violin solo which received highest critical acclaim. She had the distinction of being the first woman to record all of the caprices. She recorded them all in 2 days.

On March 19, 1987, Michaela Paetsch played both the violin and viola in a concert in the Ambassador Auditorium in Pasadena, California with Jean-Pierre Rampal on the flute, Alexandre Lagoya on the Guitar and Marielle Nordmann on the harp. And on March 19, 1987 Michaela played a concert with Jean-Pierre Rampal on the flute, John Steele Ritter on the harpsichord, Leslie Parnas on the Cello, Pierre Pierlot on the oboe, and Donald McInnes on the Viola. The critic Marc Shulgold wrote that Rampal and violist Michaela Paetsch “made a duo by Devienne seem like important music - which it isn’t.”

In March of 1988, Michaela Paetsch, with the music director Kent Nagano, performed Alfred Schnittke's 28 minute long Violin Concerto No. 4 with the Berkeley Symphony Orchestra in California with triumphant success. It had been a long time since the area had heard such direct and patrician (noble) violin playing. Allan Ulrich wrote; “Colorado-born Paetsch, a multiple competition winner, scored a triumph Saturday. It’s been ages since the area has heard such direct, patrician violin playing.”

In an interview with Michaela by John Aloysius Farrell with the Denver Post in 1986, she was quoted saying:

Michaela Paetsch was told by cellist Aldo Parisot teaching at Yale University, who her brother Johann was studying with at the time, to “Start in Europe, then bring it back here. They’ll appreciate you more.” She centered her career in Europe. In October of 1987 she played three concerts in Holland, directed by the leader of the Zurich Chamber Orchestra. He talked about her to the manager of that orchestra to listen to her. The manger was impressed and arranged for Michaela to come to Zurich and a Swiss millionaire with a rather large collection of stringed instrument loaned her a Guarneri violin to use. Shortly after that, at a private audition, the German recording company, Teldec, signed her up to a recording contract. It was like a Fairy tale that came true.

In October 1987, Michaela Paetsch recorded the 24 Capricci, Op.1 by Niccolò Paganini for Teldec. 

Michaela then returned to Denver to perform the Brahms Violin Concerto in D Major with maestra JoAnn Falletta and the Denver Chamber Orchestra in April of 1988, after being quoted as being an “Award-winning violinist and recording artist who recently recorded the Paganini Caprices on a compact disc.”

In the summer of 1988, the Colorado Springs Symphony Orchestra with the conductor, Charles Ansbacher invited Michaela to play not only in Colorado Springs but also in the Ford Amphitheatre in Vail. Michaela proved to be an outstanding crowd pleaser with her virtuoso performance of the Mendelssohn Violin Concerto in E minor.

1990s

On March 28, 1990 the Berkeley Symphony Orchestra under the direction of the American conductor Kent Nagano invited Michaela Paetsch to be the soloist in Zellerbach Hall in Berkeley, California playing the Alban Berg violin Concerto.

Tuesday, July 9, 1996 was the broadcast on Radio 3 (FM Frequencies: 90.2-92.4 MHz) in London, England of Michaela Paetsch Neftel as violin soloist with the BBC Symphony Orchestra conducted by Dmitri Kitayenko playing the Offertorium written by Sofia Gubaidulina. The Offertorium is a concerto for violin and orchestra composed in 1980.

On April 30, 1997 Michaela's father Gunther Johannes Paetsch died in Colorado Springs, Colorado at the young age of 67.

2000s

On September 22 2002, Michaela Paetsch Neftel on the violin and the American pianist Eric Le Van on the piano performed a concert at the Los Angeles County Museum of Art. They played works by Johannes Brahms and the German-Swiss composer Joachim Raff. This concert was a Highlight tip of the day and was broadcast live the Radio on KMZT-FM 105.1

Michaela Paetsch, looking back, got started in her hometown on Colorado Springs and the community prepared her for her career. She was a hometown hero from the Pikes Peak region. She was a Cheyenne Mountain High School graduate and was a featured violin soloist around the world.

Michaela has showcased her musical talents as a soloist, recitalist, and chamber musician in prominent musical hubs across the globe. Notably, she has performed at esteemed venues such as Carnegie Hall and Avery Fischer Hall in New York, as well as at the Library of Congress in Washington, D.C. Michaela has also graced the stages of esteemed music festivals including Marlboro in Vermont, Davos in Switzerland, Brandenburg Summer Concerts in Berlin, Banff in Canada, Boulder Bach Festival, and the "Mostly Mozart" festival in New York. Additionally, she has participated in the Rhein-Sieg and Niederrhein Chamber Music Festivals, both located in Germany.

Collaborating with renowned orchestras across the globe, she has performed with esteemed ensembles such as the NHK Symphony Orchestra in Tokyo and the Philharmonics of Osaka in Japan, as well as the Philharmonic orchestras of Seoul in Korea, Liége in Belgium, and Bergen in Norway. Additionally, she has worked with the National Orchestra of Belgium, the Gewandhaus in Leipzig Germany, the Hallé Orchestra in Manchester, the Frankfurt Radio Symphony, Residentie Orchestra, Orchestre de la Suisse Romande, and the BBC Symphony Orchestra in London, the Orchestra della Svizzera Italiana, amongst others. Her collaborations have brought her under the direction of esteemed conductors such as Kent Nagano, Dmitri Kitayenko, Horst Stein and Myung-whun Chung.

Her recorded works comprise a diverse range of pieces, including Niccolo Paganini's "24 Caprices" (1987), Joachim Raff's concertos with the Bamberg Symphony Orchestra, and "Sonatillen, Op. 99" and "Morceaux, Op. 85" featuring Eric Le Van on piano. Additionally, she recorded Brahms' "21 Hungarian Dances" and "La Capricieuse". Michaela has also contributed to the live recording of Sofia Gubaidulina's "Offertorium" as the featured soloist with the Bern Symphony Orchestra. Her recordings have been released through esteemed record labels such as Sony Classical, Arte Nova, cpo, and ARSIS.

From 1993 she had been the violinist for the quartet Ensemble Incanto, with which she toured extensively and recorded regularly. She lived in Bern, Switzerland and then later on moved to the city of Ligerz, Switzerland.

On December 15, 2019 Michaela played a Christmas concert in Bellmund (near Biel/Bienne) with her brother Johann and his family. The next day Michaela started Chemotherapy treatment for the recently discovered cancer that she had acquired. The players were Michaela Paetsch, violin; Valentina Paetsch, violin; Yoko Paetsch, viola; Raphaela Paetsch, cello; Dominic Paetsch, cello and Johann S. Paetsch, cello. They played to a sold-out audience a whole evening of pieces that were arranged jointly arranged by Michaela and Johann for 2 violins, viola and 3 cellos.

Personal life 

On August 3, 1990 Michaela Modjeska Paetsch married Klaus Neftel in Bern, Switzerland. They had a daughter in two years later 1992 which they named Anna Nora Neftel. Michaela lived in Ligerz, Switzerland, and traveled often to her native Colorado Springs. In Ligerz she had 3 cats: Päddi, Ashie and Saphira, who would take walks with her in the vineyards above the village.

Horses 

Michaela Paetsch's character is quite complex as she achieved two significant milestones at a very young age; breaking her first stallion at age 9, and making her debut as a violin soloist with a symphony orchestra at 11.  Her parents raised Polish-bred registered Purebred Arabian horses right at their house in Colorado Springs which bordered the Pike National Forest. The pure-bred Arabian colt that they had acquired by playing a concert in Bozeman, Montana was named "Nakiro," a name that would go on to hold great significance for Michaela, who trained and rode the young stallion in the rugged mountains behind their house.

The Paetsch household was a bustling and unique haven, mirroring the grandeur of the bright and spacious Constellation Drive residence. The melodious tunes of the piano harmonized with the playful barks of the three German Shepherd dogs and the purring of their feline companions, while piles of sheet music and equestrian gear adorned the spaces between. The presence of 11 magnificent Arabian horses was the cherry on top of this lively and vibrant atmosphere. Michaela, when not on tour, changed into her fancy-stitched cowboy boots and a battered sheepskin jacket and her cowboy hat to take "Nakiro" her chestnut stallion, out to ride in the mountains.

Death 

After fighting a long and difficult battle with cancer Michaela Paetsch passed peacefully in her sleep in a Palliative clinic in Bern, Switzerland, on January 20, 2023, at the age of 61.

Prizes 
Paetsch won numerous awards, including first prize in the G.B. Dealey International Competition in Dallas and top prizes in the Queen Elisabeth and the Tchaikovsky International Violin Competitions.

Discography 
Her extensive discography includes:
The 24 Caprices by Niccolò Paganini with Teldec.
She has also recorded with Sony Classical, Arte Nova (BMG) and Tudor.
Her recent disc of the Concertos by Joachim Raff with the Bamberg Symphony Orchestra (TUDOR 7086).
The complete music for solo strings of Daron Hagen for Arsis.
ensemble incanto - string quartet

Ancestry 

The pioneer background of Michaela Paetsch and the family on Priscilla's side extends back to the Mayflower as five ancestors including Governor William Bradford, John Howland and Elizabeth Tilley came over to the New World on the English ship by that name in 1620 and the Paetsch children are direct descendants of several Mayflower Pilgrims. Five generations of this family have been connected with Colorado Springs.

References

External links
 Michaela Paetsch's home page is http://www.michaelapaetsch.com. 
 A German web site is here: http://www.michaelapaetsch.ch
 
 Bio from the Queen Elisabeth International Competition

1961 births
2023 deaths
American classical violinists
American people of German descent
Musicians from Colorado Springs, Colorado
Women classical violinists
21st-century classical violinists
21st-century American women musicians
21st-century American violinists
20th-century classical violinists
20th-century American women musicians
20th-century American violinists
American expatriates in Switzerland